Humber Bay is a bay of Lake Ontario south of Toronto, Ontario, Canada. It is located between Ontario Place on the east and Mimico Creek to the west.  The bay gives its name to Etobicoke's Humber Bay neighbourhood.

History 

Prior to 1809 the bay was lined with a sandy shore with forest behind it. The area remained natural until later in the 19th century when it became developed with boathouses and various roadhouses and hotels.

In 1802 a ferry service to cross Humber River was established by Richard Wilson. In 1882 ferry service, Humber River Ferry Company Limited was started from the Humber to Toronto by a consortium of hotel owners (Charles Nurse, John Duck and Octavius Hicks). This service ceased operations in 1886, but later and different ferry operations continued into the 1890s to Bathurst Street and York Street. The Toronto Harbour Commission reshaped the waterfront, infilling the shoreline by 100 yards from the Humber River east to Wilson Park Avenue. This would result in the extension of Lake Shore Boulevard to the area and ending the need for ferry service as cars were able to bring hotel visitors from Toronto.

In the 1970s, the Toronto and Region Conservation Authority built Humber Bay Park at the foot of Park Lawn Avenue. The only remaining natural shoreline is that east of Wilson Park Avenue, showing a small bluff to the lake side.

Humber Bay postal village

The western riverbank of the Humber where it meets Lake Ontario was the site of an informal settlement of homes within the then Etobicoke Township. This neighbourhood was eventually cleared for the building of the Queen Elizabeth Way highway, the railway and other projects. Along Lake Shore Boulevard West in the same vicinity, the area was settled, then cleared for motels, and now cleared for condominium towers. The area is still informally known as Humber Bay.

Half Moon Bay

Half Moon Bay is the crescent shaped area between Humber Bay, the Western Channel entering Toronto Harbour (from Fort Rouillé to Strachan Avenue).

The area was a site of the landing of American troops during the Battle of York on April 27, 1813.

Today Half Moon Bay is partially covered by infill along Lake Shore Boulevard and by Ontario Place.

See also
 Annie Craig
 Humber Bay Arch Bridge
 Humber Bay Park
 Humber River (Ontario)
 Sunnyside, Toronto
 Humber Bay

References

External links
Google Satellite Image of the Humber Bay

Landforms of Toronto
Bays of Ontario